Wyalla is a rural locality in the South Burnett Region, Queensland, Australia.

Geography
The upper reaches of Lake Barambah are in the north-west corner. Barker Creek flows through the locality into Lake Barambah.

Road infrastructure
The Burnett Highway runs through from south-west to north-west.

References 

South Burnett Region
Localities in Queensland